Fuck the Police may refer to:

 Fuck the police, a slogan of the Police abolition movement
 "Fuck tha Police", a 1988 song by American rap group N.W.A that appears on the album Straight Outta Compton
 "Fuck the Police" (J Dilla song), a 2001 song by American rapper and producer Jay Dee released as a single